Veliko Rogošić (21 July 1941 – 7 August 2012) was a Croatian long-distance swimmer who competed at the Olympics for SFR Yugoslavia and won numerous awards since the start of his swimming career in 1959. Veliko Rogošić also holds the world record for longest distance ever swum in open ocean without flippers. He swum a total of 225 km (139.8 miles) across the Adriatic sea in a time of 50 hours and 10 minutes.

See also
 List of members of the International Swimming Hall of Fame

References

1941 births
2012 deaths
Yugoslav male swimmers
Croatian male swimmers
Male long-distance swimmers
Olympic swimmers of Yugoslavia
Swimmers at the 1960 Summer Olympics
Swimmers at the 1964 Summer Olympics
Deaths from lymphoma
Deaths from cancer in Croatia
Mediterranean Games silver medalists for Yugoslavia
Mediterranean Games bronze medalists for Yugoslavia
Swimmers at the 1963 Mediterranean Games
Mediterranean Games medalists in swimming